Kámen is a municipality and village in Havlíčkův Brod District in the Vysočina Region of the Czech Republic. It has about 400 inhabitants.

Administrative parts
Villages of Jiříkov and Proseč are administrative parts of Kámen.

References

Villages in Havlíčkův Brod District